Nikita Viktorovich Talalikhin (born 15 October 1986) is a former Russian professional footballer.

Club career
He played 4 seasons in the Russian Football National League for FC Ural Yekaterinburg and FC Irtysh Omsk.

External links
 
 

1986 births
Sportspeople from Yekaterinburg
Living people
Russian footballers
Association football goalkeepers
FC Ural Yekaterinburg players
FC Irtysh Omsk players
FC Khimik Dzerzhinsk players